Silent protest is an organized effort where the participants stay quiet to demonstrate disapproval. It is used as a form of civil disobedience and nonviolent resistance that encourages voicing out different opinions through certain acts such as not showing support to a certain product, attending mass parade, having symbolism, and educating and encouraging other people to join the protest. This aims to support and resolve different matters related to inequality, peace making, and nation leadership problems.

Notable Events in History 
Mohandas Gandhi, who is a known activist and spiritual leader, is a great executor of silent protest as he has always believed that it is better than committing brutal acts. He used it in numerous campaigns for India’s freedom against the British administration which then influenced more silent protests done in the upcoming years.

In 1930 when the British still ruled India, they enforced a law which only allowed people to get overtaxed salt from them, thus not allowing people to sell or collect salt on their own. Gandhi persuaded people of his country to ignore the law and do the opposite to voice out their concern regarding this law. This is known as the Salt March which helped India to be independent from the ruling administration of the British.

Examples
 On July 28, 1917, a Silent Parade took place in New York City to protest lynching.
 1968 Olympics Black Power salute
1968 Summer Olympics – Czech gymnast Věra Čáslavská looked away when the Soviet anthem was playing
 NOH8 Campaign
 2011 Belarusian protests

See also
 Blank piece of paper (protest tactic)

References

Community organizing
Nonviolence
Protest tactics